Thomas John Laidlaw (born April 15, 1958) is a Canadian retired ice hockey defenceman.

Laidlaw started his National Hockey League career with the New York Rangers in 1980, arriving from Northern Michigan University. He also played for the Los Angeles Kings.  He left the NHL after the 1990 season. He played one season for the Phoenix Roadrunners of the IHL before retiring from hockey.  Afterward, he became the colour commentator on Kings' radio broadcasts.  He currently runs a sports management company in Rye Brook, New York. Laidlaw is also a motivational speaker and frequently uses his mantra of living a "True Grit Life". Laidlaw promotes the "True Grit Life" through public speaking engagements and weekly podcast episodes.

Laidlaw competed on Survivor: Island of the Idols, the 39th season of the CBS series Survivor. He was the first Canadian-born person to be a contestant on the show. He was voted out on Day 14, finishing in 16th place out of 20 contestants.

In the 2009 book 100 Ranger Greats, the authors ranked Laidlaw at No. 87 all-time of the 901 New York Rangers who had played during the team's first 82 seasons.

Career statistics

Regular season and playoffs

Awards and honours

Survivor
Laidlaw was one of 20 castaways to compete on Survivor: Island of the Idols, the 39th season of the American reality competition show Survivor. At the start of the game, he was placed on the Lairo tribe, where he formed a bond with fellow tribemates Elaine Stott and Vince Moua. On Day Eight, Moua was voted out by the majority, despite Laidlaw's attempts to get tribemate Karishma Patel out of the game. On Day 12, Laidlaw and Stott were split up by the tribal swap; she was sent to Vokai while he remained on Lairo, where he was joined by five old Vokai members. On Day 14, Laidlaw again tried to get his tribe to vote out Patel, but the new members of the tribe, wary of Laidlaw's connections to his old tribemates, decided to vote him out instead.

References

External links
 
Tom Laidlaw's True Grit Life
Official CBS biography page

1958 births
Living people
Canadian ice hockey defencemen
Ice hockey people from Ontario
Los Angeles Kings players
National Hockey League broadcasters
New Haven Nighthawks players
New York Rangers draft picks
New York Rangers players
Northern Michigan Wildcats men's ice hockey players
Phoenix Roadrunners (IHL) players
Sportspeople from Brampton
Survivor (American TV series) contestants
San Jose Sharks announcers